The Das Contas River is a river on the border between Santa Catarina and Rio Grande do Sul states in southeastern Brazil. It is a tributary of the Pelotas River.

See also
List of rivers of Santa Catarina

References

Rivers of Santa Catarina (state)